Penni may refer to:

One hundredth of the Finnish markka currency
Gianfrancesco Penni, Italian Renaissance artist, or his brothers Luca and Bartolomeo

See also
Penny (disambiguation)